Richard Haynes may refer to:
 Richard Haynes (cricketer) (1913–1976), English cricketer
 Richard Haynes (lawyer) (1927–2017), American defense attorney
 Richard Haynes (musician) (born 1983), Australian clarinettist
 Richard Septimus Haynes (1857–1922), Australian barrister and politician

See also
 Dick Haynes (1911–1980), American actor